The 1996 Ontario New Democratic Party leadership election was held in Hamilton, Ontario, on June 22, 1996 to elect a successor to Bob Rae as leader of the Ontario New Democratic Party (NDP). The convention was necessary because Rae resigned on February 29, 1996. Frances Lankin was an early favourite but was hurt due to her close association with the Rae government. Hampton, an outsider, led on the first ballot and won the leadership by 178 votes over Lankin on the third ballot. He remained as leader of the party until 2009.

Background
In 1996 the party was in disarray after losing the 1995 election in which they lost 57 seats. The leader Bob Rae stayed on for another eight months but resigned his seat and his leadership on February 29, 1996 to return to private life.

Frances Lankin announced her candidacy on February 9, 1996. She was viewed as a frontrunner candidate having the support of such party luminaries as former leader Stephen Lewis. However her association with the Rae government as a senior cabinet minister and her support of the social contract, an austerity program based on unpaid leave for civil service workers, cost her support amongst the delegates.

Howard Hampton also put his name forward. While he was also a senior member of the Rae cabinet, he was viewed as more of an outsider, particularly because he was from northern Ontario and not based in Toronto.

Tony Silipo and Peter Kormos also entered the race. Both were longshot candidates. Silipo's campaign emphasized involvement of multicultural communities. Kormos had gained special notoriety as a maverick. Kormos was an informal leader of the left wing of the party, and a vocal opponent of the Social Contract. He had been kicked out of cabinet in 1991 after appearing as the Sunshine Boy in the right-wing Toronto Sun, and managed to get himself expelled from the legislature ten days before the convention during a debate on an education reform bill.

Union support for the candidates was mixed. The Steelworkers were divided between Lankin and Hampton while the Autoworkers were split between Lankin and Kormos. Kormos concentrated his attacks on Lankin, from the left. This weakened her initial support and when the first ballot was counted she trailed Hampton. Even though Kormos was a long shot, he managed to get more than 1/5 of the total delegate support.

After the first ballot Silipo was eliminated and he endorsed Hampton. After the second ballot, Kormos was eliminated and he endorsed no one. On the final ballot, Hampton beat Lankin by 178 votes. 80 ballots were spoiled, likely from disgruntled Kormos supporters.

Ballot results

References

1996 elections in Canada
1996 in Ontario
Ontario New Democratic Party leadership elections
Ontario New Democratic Party leadership election